Willowridge High School can refer to:

Willowridge High School (Houston)
Willowridge High School (Pretoria)